The Van Antwerp Building is a high-rise in the U.S. city of Mobile, Alabama. Completed in 1907, the building rises 11 stories and was the first skyscraper in the city. It is regarded as the first reinforced concrete skyscraper in Alabama and the Southeastern United States.  In the early 21st century, the  structure is the 8th-tallest building in Mobile.

The building, an example of Beaux-Arts architecture, was designed by architect George Bigelow Rogers for Garet Van Antwerp, a wealthy Mobile druggist. The tower was built to house his pharmacy store, with other offices on the upper floors. It remained in operation on the building's ground floor until the 1960s.

The Van Antwerp Building was purchased by RSA (the Retirement Systems of Alabama-Dr.David Bronner-CEO) in 2013. The building was unoccupied except for a 1st floor restaurant and the building was deteriorating and in bad repair.  The building was completely restored and enlarged from 2014 thru 2016 including historical restoration of the terracotta exterior, reinstalling the decorative cornice (removed in the 1950s), new windows, structural repairs, first floor historical renovation, new MEP systems and completely bringing the building up to all current building and life safety codes—Goodwyn, Mills, Cawood -(Architect) and Doster Construction Co (Construction Manager). The Van Antwerp Building is now a fully operational, completely occupied office building in the heart of downtown Mobile.

See also

List of tallest buildings in Mobile

References

Skyscraper office buildings in Mobile, Alabama
George Bigelow Rogers buildings
Beaux-Arts architecture in Alabama

Office buildings completed in 1907
1907 establishments in Alabama